Inside Views (2001) is essentially a remix album of Circulatory System's first album, Circulatory System. It is made up of "cut and paste style fragments, demos and animation derived from pieces of the circulatory system album".  The album is meant to be played on shuffle mode.

All versions come in an unmarked CD case, sprayed green, with a picture of a different bird pasted on the front.

Track listing
All tracks composed by Will Cullen Hart, and are untitled.
"One" - 3:47
"Two" - 3:42
"Three" - 3:44
"Four" - 2:30
"Five" - 2:22
"Six" - 2:56
"Seven" - 2:56
"Eight" - 1:50
"Nine" - 6:20
"Ten" - 4:31
"Eleven" - 2:55
"Twelve" - 2:17
"Thirteen" - 2:11

There is a later version of the album which has ten tracks of different lengths.

References 

Circulatory System (band) albums
2001 albums